Fiorentina Waterpolo is an Italian swimming and water polo club from Florence.

Founded in 1972, it is best known for its women's team, which won the 2007 European Cup. Most recently it was 5th in the 2012 Serie A1 and played the 2012 LEN Trophy. The men's team plays in second-tier Series A2.

Titles
 Women
 LEN European Cup 
 2007
 LEN Supercup
 2007
 Serie A1
 2007

References

Water polo clubs in Italy
Fiorentina waterpolo
LEN Women's Champions' Cup clubs
Sports clubs established in 1972
1972 establishments in Italy